Ronan Hauterville (born 21 November 1989) is a Guadeloupean professional footballer who plays as a centre-back for the club Phare Petit-Canal, and the Guadeloupe national team.

International career
Hauterville debuted with the Guadeloupe national team in a 4–1 friendly loss to Martinique on 26 June 2017. He was called up to represent Guadeloupe at the 2021 CONCACAF Gold Cup.

References

External links
 
 

1989 births
Living people
Guadeloupean footballers
Guadeloupe international footballers
Association football defenders
2021 CONCACAF Gold Cup players